Odita is a surname. Notable people with the surname include:

Obiora Odita (born 1983), Nigerian footballer
Okechukwu Odita (born 1983), Nigerian footballer
 

Surnames of Nigerian origin